is a Japanese manga series written and illustrated by Wataru Karasuma.  The series began publication in ASCII Media Works's Dengeki Daioh magazine in 2011.  Seven Seas Entertainment licensed the series for publication in North America.

Characters
 is a high school student who spends his time trying to develop the perfect visual novel video game. When he plays a new game called "[Not Alive]" that he picked up seemingly by accident when he rushed in the subway later on he finds himself pulled literally into the game and out of the flow of time as a "Player". Sharing a form in-game with former-Player-turned-Avatar , Shigeru must participate in a survival game where losing will means that Kyouka Amamiya will die and Mikami Shigeru will become an avatar.

Volumes
The series has been compiled into ten tankōbon volumes, the first of which was published in English in March 2016.

References

External links

  at Dengeki Daioh 
  at Seven Seas Entertainment
 

ASCII Media Works manga
Dengeki Daioh
Seven Seas Entertainment titles
Shōnen manga
Virtual reality in fiction
Fictional video games
Fiction about death games